Beaverdam Creek is a Pennsylvania stream near Hunterstown, northeast of Gettysburg, Pennsylvania.  The creek's intersection with the road leading to the Gettysburg Railroad's Granite station was the site of the Battle of Hunterstown on July 2, 1863.

References

Battlefields of the Eastern Theater of the American Civil War
Rivers of Adams County, Pennsylvania
Tributaries of the Susquehanna River
Rivers of Pennsylvania